The 2002 BYU Cougars football team represented Brigham Young University during the 2002 NCAA Division I-A football season.

Schedule

•SportsWest Productions (SWP) games were shown locally on KSL 5.

Roster

Game summaries

Syracuse

Hawaii

Nevada

Georgia Tech

Utah State

Air Force

UNLV

Colorado State

San Diego State

Wyoming

New Mexico

Utah

References

BYU
BYU Cougars football seasons
BYU Cougars football